Whitewater Bay is an inlet of the Gulf of Mexico in southwestern Florida in the United States. The bay is located entirely within Monroe County north of Cape Sable in the Everglades National Park. Whitewater Bay leads into Oyster Bay to the west, then Ponce de Leon Bay in the Gulf of Mexico. Hells Bay is nearby.

References
The Road Atlas '06, Rand McNally, pg. 27

Bays of Florida on the Gulf of Mexico
Everglades
Bodies of water of Monroe County, Florida